Birdwatchers is a 2008 Brazilian-Italian drama film directed by Marco Bechis and starring Claudio Santamaria, Alicélia Batista Cabreira, and Chiara Caselli. It depicts the breakdown of a community of Guarani-Kaiowa native Indians whilst attempting to reclaim their ancestral land from a local farmer.

Plot
A boat with tourists is sailing through the jungle. Suddenly they come face-to-face with Indians, naked apart from their paint, with self-made weapons at the ready. The tourists sail on excitedly. The Indians put on their jeans and collect their wages. 

The Guarani, one of Brazil's oldest Indian communities, are forced to live in a reservation. A small group decide to leave and settle in a traditional territory that has belonged to white men for several generations.

Cast
Claudio Santamaria as Roberto
Alicélia Batista Cabreira as Lia
Chiara Caselli as Beatrice
Abrísio da Silva Pedro as Osvaldo
Ademilson Concianza Verga as Irineu
Ambrósio Vilhalva as Nádio
Matheus Nachtergaele as Dimas
Fabiane Pereira da Silva as Maria
Eliane Juca da Silva as Mami
Nelson Concianza as Nhanderu
Leonardo Medeiros as Moreira
Inéia Arce Gonçalves as maid
Poli Fernandez Souza as Tito
Urbano Palácio as Josimar

Production
The film was shot in Dourados, Mato Grosso do Sul over ten weeks in 2007 with a cast whose most members had never acted before and without use of a script.

The songs "Sacris solemnis" and "O gloriosa virginum" were composed by the Italian Jesuit Domenico Zipoli who went to South America to live at the Jesuit reductions.

Awards
2010 One World Media Award in the Drama category, by unanimous vote of the jury.

See also
Survival International

References

External links
Official Birdwatchers film website
Guarani Survival Fund – Guarani fund launched with an appeal at the end of the film

Guardian review by Tom Phillips, retrieved 11/09/09

2008 drama films
Brazilian drama films
2000s English-language films
Films about hunter-gatherers
Films directed by Marco Bechis
Films shot in Brazil
Guaraní-language films
Indigenous cinema in Latin America
Italian drama films
2000s Portuguese-language films
2008 multilingual films
Brazilian multilingual films
Italian multilingual films